FC Metalist-2 Kharkiv was a Ukrainian football team based in Kharkiv, Ukraine. The club has been featured regularly in the Ukrainian Second Division it serves as a junior team for the FC Metalist Kharkiv franchise. Like most tributary teams, the best players are sent up to the senior team, meanwhile developing other players for further call-ups.

The FC Avanhard Merefa that represented the Kharkiv Glass Factory was promoted to the Ukrainian Second League in 1996. After bankruptcy of the factory, the club was merged with FC Metalist Kharkiv and moved to Kharkiv initially as Avanhard-Metalist Kharkiv. The next season the club was officially renamed into Metalist-2 Kharkiv.

With introduction of competitions for reserves teams of the Higher League and placing 14th out of 15 team in the Second League competition, the team was withdrawn out of the league.

League history

 
FC Metalist Kharkiv
Metalist-2 Kharkiv
Association football clubs established in 1997
Association football clubs disestablished in 2005
1997 establishments in Ukraine
2005 disestablishments in Ukraine
Metalist-2 Kharkiv
Football clubs in Kharkiv